Per Harry Nylén, better known as Pelle Nylén, born 4 February 1965 in Gävle, is a Swedish music producer and songwriter. He previously played guitar in the band Modesty in the 1980s.

Songwriting Discography

2000
 Westlife, "My Love"

2001
 Steps, "Words Are Not Enough"

2002
 Westlife, "Walk Away"

2004
 Hanna Pakarinen, "Don't Hang Up"
 Bellefire, "Sold Out"

2005
 Carrie Underwood, "Inside Your Heaven"
 Bo Bice, "Inside Your Heaven"

2006
 Tobias Regner, "My One Mistake"
 Tobias Regner, "In Your Hands"
 Bryan Rice, "Can't Say I'm Sorry"

2007
 Erik Segerstedt, "Can't Say I'm Sorry"
 Lisa Bund, "If I Lose You"
 Lisa Bund, "Picture Perfect"

2014
Carrie Underwood, Inside Your Heaven 
US Top Country Albums No 1 (Billboard)

References 

1965 births
Living people
Swedish record producers
Swedish songwriters